Wilfried Lorenz (born 18 January 1932) is a German sailor who competed in the 1964 Summer Olympics. He was born in Rostock.

References

External links
 

1932 births
Possibly living people
German male sailors (sport)
Olympic sailors of the United Team of Germany
Sailors at the 1964 Summer Olympics – Dragon
Olympic silver medalists for the United Team of Germany
Olympic medalists in sailing
Sportspeople from Rostock
Medalists at the 1964 Summer Olympics